James Michael Castleman was an American Football Defensive End for the FXFL Blacktips of the Fall Experimental Football League (FXFL). He played college football at Oklahoma State.

Personal life 
James Castleman started as a young boy who loved sports and started with a passion for basketball.  He played for the Amarillo Gators (an Amarillo city league team).  Which seemed to quickly change to dominating all High School sports at Amarillo High School.  He caught the attention of many college recruits especially for his agility and diversity in football.  He signed to Oklahoma State as a Defensive Tackle, playing all 4 years and in 4 bowl games.  This is where he met his sweetheart Carson Leon (an OSU cheerleader) who he married in May 2018.

College career
Despite playing as a defensive tackle, he became known for his 48-yard reception in the 2015 Cactus Bowl.

Professional career

NFL 2015
Castleman was given tryouts with the National Football League Green Bay Packers and Kansas City Chiefs in 2015 and was signed by neither team.

References

External links
 Oklahoma State Cowboys Player bio

Living people
Oklahoma State Cowboys football players
1992 births
American football defensive ends
Blacktips (FXFL) players